"Luck" is a song written by Zachary Barnett, David Rublin, Matthew Sanchez and James Shelley of American indie rock band American Authors, co-written with producers Aaron Accetta and Shep Goodman. The song was originally recorded for their debut extended play, American Authors, and appears as the third track on the EP. The track later appeared as the fourth track on their debut studio album Oh, What a Life. The song was released by Island Records in Canada as a one-track single on March 3, 2014, becoming the fourth single by the band and the second release promoting Oh, What a Life, after "Trouble".

Track listing

Personnel
Adapted from Oh, What a Life liner notes.

American Authors
Zac Barnett – lead vocals, guitar
James Adam Shelley – lead guitar, banjo
Dave Rublin – bass
Matt Sanchez – drums

Technical personnel
Aaron Accetta – production
Michael Goodman – production

Release history

Commercial

References

Songs about luck
2013 songs
2014 singles
American Authors songs
Island Records singles
Songs written by Shep Goodman
Songs written by Aaron Accetta
Song recordings produced by Aaron Accetta